Sphenarches caffer, the bottle gourd plume moth, is a moth of the family Pterophoridae. It is known from India, Malaysia, Mauritius, the Seychelles and South Africa.

The larvae feed on the leaves, flowers and fruits of various plants, including sweet potato. They are small, cylindrical and yellowish green with short spines all over their bodies.

References

Platyptiliini
Moths described in 1852
Moths of Sub-Saharan Africa
Moths of Asia
Moths of Mauritius
Moths of Seychelles
Moths of New Zealand
Taxa named by Philipp Christoph Zeller